The R500 is a regional road in County Tipperary running south west from Nenagh to a junction with the R499 road at Silvermines.

See also
 Roads in Ireland - (Primary National Roads)
 Secondary Roads
 Regional Roads

References

Regional roads in the Republic of Ireland
Roads in County Tipperary